"See Me In Shadow" is the second single of the Dutch symphonic metal band Delain from the album Lucidity. It was released on 2 July 2007 by Roadrunner Records.

Track listing
 "See Me in Shadow" (Single Edit) - 3.36
 "Frozen" (Acoustic Version) - 4.27
 "Silhouette of a Dancer" (Acoustic Version) - 3.21
 "See Me in Shadow" (Acoustic Version) - 3.36
 "See Me in Shadow" (Video) - 3.36

Personnel
Charlotte Wessels – vocals
Ronald Landa – guitars
Ray van Lente – guitars
Rob van der Loo – Bass
Martijn Westerholt – keyboards
Sander Zoer – drums
Liv Kristine - vocals (album version only)
Rupert Gillet - cello

Charts

References 

2007 singles
Heavy metal ballads
Songs written by Charlotte Wessels
Songs written by Martijn Westerholt
Delain songs
2006 songs
Roadrunner Records singles